Sally Pechinsky (born March 4, 1950) is an American fencer. She competed in the women's team foil event at the 1968 Summer Olympics. She is married to fellow American fencer Edward Ballinger.

References

External links
 

1950 births
Living people
American female foil fencers
Olympic fencers of the United States
Fencers at the 1968 Summer Olympics
21st-century American women